The Chief Baron of the Irish Exchequer was the Baron (judge) who presided over the Court of Exchequer (Ireland). The Irish Court of Exchequer was a mirror of the equivalent court in England and was one of the four courts which sat in the building which is still called The Four Courts in Dublin.  

The title Chief Baron was first used in 1309 by Walter de Islip. In the early centuries of its existence, it was a political as well as a judicial office, and as late as 1442 the Lord Treasurer of Ireland thought it necessary to recommend that the Chief Baron should always be a properly trained lawyer (which Michael Gryffin, the Chief Baron at the time, was not). There are two cryptic references in the Patent Rolls, for 1386 and 1390, to the  Liberty of Ulster having its own Chief Baron.

The last Chief Baron, The Rt Hon. Christopher Palles, continued to hold the title after the Court was merged into a new High Court of Justice in Ireland in 1878, until his retirement in 1916, when the office lapsed.

Chief Barons of the Irish Exchequer

Walter de Islip 1309 
William de Meones 1311
Nicholas de Balscote 1313
Richard le Brun 1319
Adam de Harvington (or Herwynton) 1324
Thomas de Montpellier 1327
Roger de Birthorpe 1327
John de Braideston 1329
William de Tickhill 1331
Robert le Poer,  first term 1331
Thomas atte Crosse 1335
Hugh de Burgh, first term 1337 
Robert le Poer, second term 1339
Hugh de Burgh, second term 1344 
Robert de Emeldon 1351 
John de Burnham 1355
Robert de Holywood,  first term 1363
John Keppock 1364 
Robert de Holywood, second term 1367
Stephen Bray  first term 1376
Henry Mitchell 1376
Stephen Bray,  second term 1377
Thomas Bache,  first term 1382
William de Karlell 1383
Thomas Bache, second term 1384
William Skrene 1395
William Tynbegh, first term 1397
Richard Rede 1399
Robert Sutton 1401
Thomas Bache, third term 1403
William Tynbegh,  second term 1405
James Fitzwilliam 1413
William Tynbegh, third term 1415
James Uriell 1417
James Cornwalsh,  first term 1420
Richard Sydgrave 1423
James Cornwalsh, second term 1426
John Cornwalsh, first term 1441
Michael Gryffin or Gryffen 1441
John Cornwalsh, second term 1446 
Thomas Bathe, 1st Baron Louth 1473 
Henry Duffe 1478
Thomas Plunket 1480
Oliver FitzEustace 1482
John Burnell 1482 Deputy
John Estrete 1487 Deputy
John Wyse 1492
Clement Fitzleones 1493 Deputy 

Walter Ivers 1494
John Topcliffe 1496
Walter St. Lawrence 1496
Thomas Kent 1504
Richard Golding 1511
Bartholomew Dillon 1514
Richard Golding, second term 1515
Patrick Finglas 1520
Gerald Aylmer  25 June 1534 
Patrick Finglas, second term, 1535
Richard Delahide 1537
James Bathe 1540
Lucas Dillon 1570
Robert Napier 1593
Edmund Pelham 1602
Humphrey Winch 8 November 1606 
John Denham 1609
William Methold,  or Methwold 1612
Sir John Blennerhassett 1621
Richard Bolton 1625
Edward Bolton 1639
Miles Corbet 1655
John Bysse 1660
Henry Hene 1680 
Stephen Rice 1687
John Hely 5 December 1690
Sir Robert Doyne 10 May 1695
Nehemiah Donnellan 27 December 1703
Richard Freeman 25 June 1706
Robert Rochfort 12 June 1707
Joseph Deane 14 October 1714
Jeffrey Gilbert 16 June 1715
Bernard Hale 9 June 1722 
Thomas Dalton 2 September 1725
Thomas Marlay 29 September 1730
John Bowes 21 December 1741
Edward Willes 11 March 1757
Anthony Foster 5 September 1766
James Dennis (afterwards Baron Tracton) 3 July 1777
Walter Hussey Burgh 2 July 1782 
Barry Yelverton (afterwards 1st Viscount Avonmore) 29 November 1783
Standish O'Grady (afterwards 1st Viscount Guillamore) 5 October 1805
Henry Joy 6 January 1831
Stephen Woulfe 20 July 1838
Maziere Brady, 11 February 1840 
David Richard Pigot 1 September 1846
Christopher Palles 10 February 1874

References

 
Irish Exchequer
Irish Exchequer